Xianghua may refer to:

Xianghua, Xichuan County (香花镇), town in Henan
Xianghua, Chongming County (向化镇), town in Chongming County, Shanghai
Xiang Chinese, or Hunanese
Chai Xianghua, character in the Soulcalibur series of fighting games produced by Namco
Danzhou dialect, a dialect of Yue Chinese (Cantonese) around Danzhou, Hainan
Xianghua dialect or Waxiang Chinese